Dicerca lugubris is a species of beetle from the subfamily Chrysochroinae first described by John Lawrence LeConte in 1860. It is dark-cupreous coloured on top and black-cupreous below. The species can be found on Lake Superior, Marquette, Michigan as well as Laniel, Quebec. It is also found in Iowa, Alberta, and southeastern North America where it feeds on jack pine.

References

Beetles described in 1860
Beetles of North America
Buprestidae
Taxa named by John Lawrence LeConte